Good Guys, Bad Guys was an Australian comedy/drama TV series that screened on the Nine Network between 1997 and 1998, with a telemovie and twenty-six episodes produced. The crime-themed show was set in Melbourne.

The program and its lead character Elvis Maginnis were written for Marcus Graham, a former star of the soap opera E Street (TV series). Maginnis is disgraced former cop, tainted by his criminal family and framed for corruption. Elvis owns "K for Kleen" drycleaning, managed by Stella Kinsella (Alison Whyte, of the ABC current affairs satire series Frontline) and Reuben Zeus who has Tourette syndrome (Travis McMahon, most recently of Last Man Standing).

Elvis's attempts at a straight life are constantly compromised by the demands of his eccentric family, while Stella's attempts at making "K-for-Kleen" turn a profit are frustrated by Elvis's soft heart.

The program was filmed in Melbourne, predominantly around the inner-city "bohemian" suburbs of St. Kilda, Fitzroy and Carlton. The film style incorporated local colour  - Melbourne trams, landmarks like Smith Street's Cobra cane furniture shop, and the Builder's Arms Hotel as Elvis's local - and a soundtrack of the then-latest Australian music, matched to the action. The Good Guys, Bad Guys soundtrack CD features Regurgitator, The Fauves, Nick Cave and the Bad Seeds, The Whitlams, The Avalanches, Spiderbait, The Cruel Sea , Rebecca's Empire and The Mavis's among others.

Cast

Main cast
 Marcus Graham - Elvis Maginnis
 Alison Whyte - Stella Kinsella
 Travis McMahon - Reuben Zeus

Guest cast
Good Guys, Bad Guys guest starred many Australian actors, including Zoe Carides, Samuel Johnson, Belinda Giblin, Nadine Garner, Sophie Lee, Vince Colosimo, Annie Jones, Claudia Black, Red Symons, Magda Szubanski, Sonia Todd, Jane Hall, John Waters, Frankie J. Holden, Bruce Spence, John McTernan, Nicholas Bell, Ben Mendelsohn, Norman Hancock, Lisa Hensley and Petra Yared.

Awards
In 1997, the show won 'Best Mini-Series or Telefeature' at the AFI Awards. In 1998, cast member Alison Whyte was nominated for 'Most Outstanding Actress' at the Logie Awards for her role in the show.

International broadcasts

In 1997 and 1998, the series was shown on Russian television channels TV Tsentr and Stolitsa.

Home media 

In 2007 Force Australia released season one of Good Guys, Bad Guys on DVD. Then Force Australia stopped operating and was taken over by Beyond Home Entertainment who released season two of Good Guys, Bad Guys on DVD in September 2007.

See also 

 List of Australian television series

References

External links
Good Guys, Bad Guys at the National Film and Sound Archive
Good Guys, Bad Guys at Australian Screen Online

Nine Network original programming
Australian drama television series
1997 Australian television series debuts
1998 Australian television series endings
Television series by Beyond Television Productions